Hilldale Public Schools is an independent school district located in Muskogee, Oklahoma. The district was started in 1909 as a one-room school, and has grown to a current student body of 1,807 students in pre-K through 12th grade. The district now operates three campuses. The school mascot is the Hornet and the school colors are Red and White. Hilldale High School developed gradually as the demand for higher grade levels increased. In 1982, Hilldale High School graduated its first class of seniors.

In late 2012, the District passed a bond issue for construction of two new cafeterias (one large cafe at each site), new classrooms at the middle school, and a new band room at the Secondary site.

School activities include girls and boys basketball, girls and boys soccer, softball, baseball, football, cheerleading, track, band, color guard, academic team, and many school clubs starting in all starting in 7th grade but band, color guard, and soccer. Which all start in 9th grade.

References

External links
 Official page

School districts in Oklahoma
Muskogee, Oklahoma
Education in Muskogee County, Oklahoma
School districts established in 1909